Yessica is a female given name and may refer to:

Yéssica Mouton (born 1987), Bolivian model who was crowned Miss Bolivia 2011, and competed in the 2012 Miss Universe
Yessica Ramírez, who represented the Mexican state of Baja California in the national pageant Nuestra Belleza Mexico
Yessica Salazar, woman from the Mexican state of Jalisco who competed in Nuestra Belleza Mexico and obtained the title of Miss Mexico World

Feminine given names